Navagunjara or Nabagunjara is a mythical creature composed of nine different animals in Hinduism. 

The animal is a common motif in the Pata-Chitra style of painting, of the Indian state of Odisha. The beast is considered a form of the god Vishnu, or of Krishna, who is considered an avatar of Vishnu. It is considered a variant of the virat-rupa (omnipresent or vast) form of Krishna, that he displays to Arjuna, as mentioned in the Bhagavad Gita, a part of the epic Mahabharata.

Literature 

The version of the Hindu epic Mahabharata, written by the Odia poet Sarala Dasa, narrates the legend of Navagunjara; no other version has the story. Once, when Arjuna was doing penance on a hill, Krishna-Vishnu appears to him as Navagunjara. Navagunjara has the head of a rooster, and stands on three feet, those of an elephant, tiger and deer or horse; the fourth limb is a raised human arm carrying a lotus or a wheel. The beast has the neck of a peacock, the back or hump of a bull and the waist of a lion; the tail is a serpent. Initially, Arjuna was terrified as well as mesmerized by the strange creature and raises his bow to shoot it. Finally, Arjuna realizes that Navagunjara is a manifestation of Vishnu and drops his weapons, bowing before Navagunjara.

Architecture 
The Navagunjara-Arjuna scene is sculpted at the northern side of the Jagannath Temple, Puri. Also, the Nila Chakra disc atop the Jagannath Temple has eight Navagunjaras carved on the outer circumference, with all facing towards the flagpost above.

In popular culture 

Navagunjara is also depicted in Ganjifa playing cards as the King card and Arjuna as the minister card, in parts of Odisha, mainly in Puri District and Ath-Rangi Sara in Ganjam District, Odisha. This set is known as Navagunjara.

See also
Nawarupa

References

Hindu legendary creatures
Forms of Vishnu
Forms of Krishna
Mythological hybrids
Mythological monsters